James, Jim, Jimmy, or Jamie Collins may refer to:

Sports

Association football (Soccer)
Jimmy Collins (footballer, born 1872) (1872–1900), Scottish footballer
Jimmy Collins (footballer, born 1895), Scottish footballer
Jimmy Collins (footballer, born 1903) (1903–1977), English footballer who played for West Ham United
Jimmy Collins (footballer, born 1911) (1911–1983), English footballer
Jimmy Collins (footballer, born 1923), Irish goalkeeper during the 1940s and 1950s
Jimmy Collins (footballer, born 1937) (1937–2018), Scottish footballer
Jamie Collins (footballer, born 1978), English footballer (Crewe Alexandra)
James Collins (footballer, born 1983), Welsh international footballer (Cardiff City, Aston Villa, West Ham United, Ipswich Town)
Jamie Collins (footballer, born 1984), English footballer (Eastleigh)
James Collins (footballer, born 1990), Irish footballer (Shrewsbury Town, Swindon Town, Hibernian, Crawley Town, Luton Town)
Jim Collins (footballer, born 1923) (1923–1996), footballer for Barrow and Chester City

Other football
Jim Collins (American football coach), college football coach and former player
Jim Collins (Australian footballer) (1896–1990), Australian rules football
Jim Collins (linebacker) (born 1958), American football linebacker and NFL Pro Bowler
James Collins (rugby union) (born 1986), English rugby union player, currently playing for Worcester Warriors

Baseball
Jimmy Collins (1870–1943), American baseball player
Ripper Collins (baseball) (James Anthony Collins, 1904–1970), baseball player

Basketball
James Collins (basketball) (born 1973), NBA basketball player
Jimmy Collins (basketball) (1946–2020), American basketball player and coach

Hockey
Jim Collins (ice hockey) (born 1951), Canadian ice hockey player
James Collins (field hockey), Australian field hockey player

Other sports
Jim Collins (curler) (1921–1982), Canadian curler

Arts
Jim Collins (singer) (born 1959), American country music singer-songwriter
James Collins (songwriter), Canadian songwriter, actor and singer

Government and Military
James Collins (public servant) (1869–1934), Australian Secretary of the Department of the Treasury
James Lawton Collins (1882–1963), U.S. Army general
James Collins (Irish politician) (1900–1967), Irish politician and father of Gerard Collins
James Francis Collins (1905–1989), U.S. Army general
James M. Collins (1916–1989), U.S. Representative for the 3rd Congressional District of Texas
James Lawton Collins Jr. (1917–2002), U.S. Army general, military historian, and viticulturist
James Franklin Collins (born 1939), U.S. diplomat and Ambassador to Russia

Science and Commerce
James L. Collins (1883–1953), Texas oil man and community philanthropist
James T. Collins (born 1946), American linguist
James E. Collins (born 1953), American veterinary physician
James C. Collins (born 1958), American business consultant
James Collins (bioengineer) (born 1965), known as Jim, Termeer Professor of Medical Engineering & Science at MIT
James "Jim" Collins, CEO of Corteva

See also
Jamie Collins (disambiguation)